Curse of the Talisman is a 2001 made-for-TV horror film directed by Colin Budds. It starred Jesse Spencer, Capkin Van Alphen and Sara Gleeson.

Plot
Medieval gargoyles bring real Halloween terror to a group of small-town citizens when a dormant demon is unleashed and along with it a 900-year-old curse.

Cast
Jesse Spencer as Jeremy Campbell
Capkin Van Alphen as Worker
Sara Gleeson as Fiona		
Robert Coleby as Museum Curator
Tempany Deckert as Miranda
Max Garner Gore as Darryl
Gus Mercurio as Junkyard Owner
Rod Mullinar as Father Eccleston

Soundtrack

Critical reception
Curse of the Talisman received mixed reviews generally unfavorable from critics. Clayton Trapp of Brilliant Observations on 1173 Films gave "Curse of the Talisman" one stars (out of two) and said, "Film gets on a formulaic track early and refuses to get off, which partly works for it. It's the least scary monster movie I've ever seen but it's satisfied to be there, they just want to stay on formula and entertain us the way that others have entertained them. No pretensions (no one is sitting around reading Nietzsche), no special effects addiction (but funny where used), no sex and gore over-the-topness (the gargoyles are actually kind of cute), no bullshit (or all bullshit, according to taste)." Video Picks for Perverts simply said, "There's no tits, either. Fucking worthless."

External links

2001 television films
2001 films
2001 horror films
2000s American films
2000s English-language films
American horror television films
Films directed by Colin Budds
Films set in Australia
UPN original films